Calophasia opalina is a moth of the family Noctuidae first described by Eugenius Johann Christoph Esper in 1793. It is found from Southern Europe to Central Asia.

The wingspan is 26–31 mm. Adults are on wing from April to June and again from July September in two generations per year.

The larvae feed on the leaves and flowers Antirrhinum, Delphinium and Linaria species. The pupae of the second generation overwinter.

References

External links

"Calophasia opalina (Esper, [1794])". Butterflies & Moths of Palaearctic Regions. Retrieved January 24, 2021.
 Taxonomy
"09245 Calophasia opalina (Esper, 1794)". Lepiforum e. V. Retrieved January 24, 2021.

Moths described in 1793
Cuculliinae
Moths of Europe
Moths of Asia
Taxa named by Eugenius Johann Christoph Esper